Pangea Day is an international multimedia event conducted on May 10, 2008. Cairo, Kigali, London, Los Angeles, Mumbai and Rio de Janeiro were linked to produce a 4-hour program of films, music and speakers. The program was broadcast live across the globe from 1800 to 2200 UTC, culminating in a global drum circle, symbolizing the common heartbeat of the world. According to the festival organizers, "Pangea Day plans to use the power of film to bring the world a little closer together."

Pangea Day originated in 2006 when documentary filmmaker Jehane Noujaim won the TED Prize. Jehane wished to use film to bring the world together.

Pangea refers to the supercontinent from which all current continents initially separated from. It serves as a reminder of the "connectedness" or unitary nature of all people on Planet Earth.

Goals 
Bring together millions of people from all over the world in a unique shared experience.
Use the power of film to create a better understanding of one another.
Form a global community striving for a better future.

Live broadcast locations 
Pangea Day was broadcast live from seven cities:

Cairo - The Pyramids
Kigali - Jali Gardens
London - Somerset House
Los Angeles - Sony Pictures Studios
Mumbai - National Centre for the Performing Arts
Rio de Janeiro - Morro da Urca
Buenos Aires - [KONEX Theater]

In the United States, Current TV was the exclusive, English-language broadcaster.

Featured Films 

A Thousand Words  directed by Ted Chung
More  directed by Mark Osborne
L'Homme Sans Tete  directed by Juan Diego Solanas
Happy Together  directed by Sam Nozik
Dreaming of Zhejiang directed by Marineta Mak Kritikou

Global partner 
Nokia was Pangea Day's premier global partner. In addition to providing financial support, Nokia sent video enabled devices to film schools and programs in disadvantaged areas and conflict zones, and to UNHCR refugee camps. Some of the films made in these locations were included in the Pangea Day broadcast.

Key participants

Hosts 
June Arunga
Lisa Ling
Max Lugavere
Jason Silva

Advisory board

J. J. Abrams
Lawrence Bender
Nancy Buirski
Alan Cumming
Richard Curtis
Ami Dar
Cameron Diaz
Matthew Freud
Bob Geldof
Goldie Hawn
Jim Hornthal
Judy McGrath
Pat Mitchell
Vik Muniz
Clare Munn
Mira Nair
Dr. Tero Ojanperä
Eboo Patel
Alexander Payne
Richard Rogers
Meg Ryan
Deborah Scranton
Paul Simon
Jeffrey Skoll
Sir Martin Sorrell
Philippe Starck
Dave Stewart
Yossi Vardi
Kevin Wall
Forest Whitaker
will.i.am
Paul Zilk

Speakers

 Christiane Amanpour
 Bassam Aramin
 Karen Armstrong
 June Arunga
 Ali Abu Awwad
 Ishmael Beah
 Donald Brown
 Assaad Chaftari
 Muhieddine Chehab
 Robi Damelin
 Jonathan Harris
 Robert Kurzban
 Lisa Ling
 Max Lugavere
 Khaled Aboul Naga
 Queen Noor of Jordan
 Eboo Patel
 Carolyn Porco
 Jean-Paul Samputu
 Yonathan Shapira
 Jason Silva

Musicians

 Dave Stewart
 Gilberto Gil
 Hypernova
 Rokia Traoré

Notes and references

External links 

"Can Your Film Change the World?" - Pangea Day promo video at YouTube

Festivals in Egypt
Multimedia works
2008 television specials
International broadcasting
Films directed by Jehane Noujaim
Festivals in Rwanda
Festivals in London
Arts festivals in the United States
Cultural festivals in India
Arts festivals in Brazil
Cultural festivals in the United States
Cultural festivals in Brazil
Festivals in Rio de Janeiro